Robert Buchanan may refer to:

 Robert Buchanan (playwright) (1785–1873), Scottish minister and professor of logic and rhetoric at the University of Glasgow
 Bob Buchanan (baseball) (born 1961), American baseball player
 Robert Buchanan (Owenite) (1813–1866), Scottish socialist writer, lecturer and journalist
 Robert Williams Buchanan (1841–1901), Scottish writer, son of Robert Buchanan the Owenite
 Robert Buchanan (footballer, born 1867) (1867–1909), Scottish footballer
 Robert Buchanan (footballer, born 1887) (1887–?), Scottish footballer
 Robbie Buchanan (born 1996), Scottish footballer
 Robert C. Buchanan (1811–1878), American military officer
 Robert Buchanan (actor) (born 1962), former Scottish actor
 Robert D. Buchanan (born 1931), creator of several animated TV shows
 Robert Buchanan (minister) (1802–1875), Moderator of the General Assembly of the Free Church of Scotland 1860/61
 Bob Buchanan (curler), American curler
 Robert Joseph Buchanan, American neurosurgeon, psychiatrist, and bioethicist